Rajah Baguinda Ali, also known as Rajah Baginda Ali, Rajah Baginda, Raha Baguinda, or Rajah Baguinda, was a prince from a Minangkabau kingdom in Sumatra, Indonesia called "Pagaruyung". (Baginda/Baguinda is a Minangkabau honorific for prince.) He was the leader of the forming polity in Sulu, Philippines, which later turned into the Sultanate of Sulu.

History

Arrival to Philippines
Baguinda Ali arrived to Buansa, Sulu on year 1390 CE, just ten years after the Sheikh Karim-ul Makhdum reached Sulu himself and brought Islam to the Philippines. Initially, the natives of Buansa were suspicious of him; they tried to sink his boats, to let him drown at sea. Baguinda Ali fought back (only in defence) and inquired to these people "why are you trying to drown me?" He insisted he came to Sulu out of travel and out of goodwill—to live among Sulu natives who, like him, were followers of Mohammad. The people of Sulu accepted his reasoning, and he eventually became one with the people. They even named him Rajah—Rajah Baguinda Ali. The preference of the people of Sulu to call him "Rajah" instead of "Sultan" connotes there was a pre-Islamic period in the history of the Sultanate of Sulu.

Rajah Baguinda and Abu Bakr
Year 1450 CE, a Johore-born Arab adventurer, Sayyid Abubakar bin Abirin, came to Sulu and asked the people: "Where is your town and where is your place of worship?" and they said, "Buansa." He then came to Buansa and lived with Rajah Baguinda Ali, the ruler of the Principality of Sulu.

Abubakar bin Abirin bore the titles Sayyid (alternatively spelled Saiyid, Sayyed, Seyyed, Sayed, Seyed, Syed, Seyd) and walShareef an honorific that denotes he was an accepted descendant of the Islamic prophet Muhammad through both the Imams Hassan and Hussain. His name is also alternatively spelled Sayyid walShareef Abu Bakr ibn Abirin AlHashmi. He was a Najeeb AlTarfayn Sayyid.

The genealogy of Sultan Sharif ul-Hashim describes him as a descendant of Muhammad, through his maternal bloodline, Sayyed Zainul Abidin of Hadhramaut, Yemen, who belongs to the fourteenth generation of Hussain, the grandson of Muhammad.

Rajah Baguinda Ali had no male heir, but had a daughter called Dayang-dayang Paramisuli. (Dayang-dayang is an Austronesian honorific for "Lady", and precedes a woman's name to denote that she is of high rank and noble standing/noble blood.) Eventually Dayang-dayang Paramisuli married Sayyid Abubakar, and Rajah Baginda Ali named Sayyid Abubakar as heir to the Principality.

Year 1457 CE, the beginning of Sayyid Abubakar's reign. He changed the form of polity of Sulu, from a principality to a sultanate. He took a regnal name embellished with five titles, and thus, at the formation of the Sultanate of Sulu, he became known as Paduka Mahasari Maulana al Sultan Sharif ul-Hashim, or "The Master (Paduka) His Majesty (Mahasari), Protector (Maulana) and (al) Sultan (Sultan), Sharif (Sharif) of (ul-) Hashim (Hashim)". [The Sharif of Hashim part is a reference to his nobility as a descendant of Hashim clan, a clan the Islamic prophet Muhammad was a part of.] His regnal name is often shortened to Sharif ul-Hashim.

See also
 Karim-ul Makhdum
 Sayyid Abubakar Abirin
 Sultanate of Sulu
 Sulu

References

History of Sulu
Minangkabau people
Princes